Western Command is a Command-level formation of the Indian Army. It was formed in 1920. It was disbanded following its demotion to an independent district and eventual merge with Northern Command to form the North-western Army. It was re-raised in 1947 following the transfer of Northern Command HQ to Pakistan. Until 1972, it was responsible for India's border with Pakistan in the North and West and the Chinese border in the North.  The Command HQ is in Chandimandir, Haryana, about 5 km east of Chandigarh.

Lieutenant General Nav Kumar Khanduri is the GOC-in-C: he takes over on 1 November 2021.

History

Pre-Independence 
The Presidency armies were abolished with effect from 1 April 1895 when the three Presidency armies of Bengal, Bombay, and Madras became the Indian Army. The Indian Army was divided into four Commands: Bengal Command, Bombay Command, Madras Command and Punjab Command, each under a lieutenant general.

Between 1904 and 1908, the Bombay Command was renamed as the Western Command. In 1908, the four commands were merged into two Armies: Northern Army and Southern Army as recommended by then Commander-in-Chief, Indian Army Lord Kitchener. This system persisted until 1920 when the arrangement reverted to four commands again: Eastern Command, Northern Command, Southern Command and Western Command.

In 1937, Western Command was downgraded to become the Western Independent District commanded by a major general. In April 1942, the Western Independent District was absorbed in the Northern Command which itself was re-designated as North Western Army.

Re-raising
After the partition of India, the erstwhile command HQ, Northern Command, went to Pakistan and was renamed as GHQ, Pakistan. The communal violence of partition necessitated the raising of a new command headquarters to relieve Army Headquarters of the day to day overseeing of operations of the two independent areas in north India.

This command, initially named Delhi and East Punjab Command was raised in Delhi on 14 September 1947 with Lt Gen Sir Dudley Russell as its commander. It was responsible to administer the Delhi Independent Area and the East Punjab Independent Area.

On 26 October 1947, following the accession of Jammu and Kashmir to India, Western Command was put in charge of all Indian Army operations to secure the area for India.

Initially a division sized force Jammu and Kashmir Division was raised on 5 November 1947 under Maj Gen Kulwant Singh for overseeing operations in Jammu and Kashmir. This was later split into two parts Jammu Division (under Maj Gen Atma Singh) and Srinagar Division (under Maj Gen K.S. Thimayya) to oversee operations in Jammu and Kashmir respectively.

The II Corps (Ambala), IX Corps (Yol), XI Corps (Jalandhar) and 40th Artillery Division (Ambala) are control operational units in Western Command.

Structure 
Command's Area Of Responsibility (AOR) covers the states of Punjab, Haryana, Delhi and parts of Jammu.

The Western Command has been assigned operational units:- II Corps, IX Corps, XI Corps and 40th Artillery Division. The command in total has following units under its belt :-  6 infantry divisions, 1 armoured division, 1 artillery division, 1 Reorganised Army Plains Infantry Division (RAPID), 3 armoured brigade, 1 mechanized brigade, 1 Air-defence brigade, and 1 engineering brigade.

Precursors (1855–1947) 
Following is the list of precursors to the Western Command and their commanders:

Bombay Army (1855–1895)

Bombay Command (1895–1904)

Western Command (1904–1908)

Western Command (1920–1938)

Western Independent District (1938–1942)

North-Western Army (1942–1945)

Delhi and East Punjab Command (1947–1948)

List of GOC-in-C of Western Command (1948–present)

Notes

Further reading 
Richard A. Renaldi and Ravi Rikhye, 'Indian Army Order of Battle,' Orbat.com for Tiger Lily Books: A division of General Data LLC, 2011.

Commands of the Indian Army
Military units and formations established in 1947
1947 establishments in India